Hinganghat Assembly constituency is one of the 288 Vidhan Sabha (legislative assembly) constituencies in Maharashtra state in western India. This constituency is one of the four Vidhan Sabha constituencies in the Wardha district.

Hinganghat is part of the Wardha Lok Sabha constituency along with five other Vidhan Sabha segments, namely Wardha, Arvi and Deoli in Wardha district and Morshi and Dhamangaon Railway in the Amravati district.
Hinganghat Assembly constituency is the biggest Assembly constituency in the Wardha district.

List of members of legislative assembly

See also
 Hinganghat
 Samudrapur
 Seloo
 List of constituencies of Maharashtra Vidhan Sabha

References

https://www.india.com/assembly-election-2019/maharashtra/hinganghat-election-results/
https://www.news18.com/news/politics/hinganghat-election-results-2019-live-updates-winner-loser-leading-trailing-2358627.html

Assembly constituencies of Maharashtra